"Because" ("Parce Que") is a song  with music and lyrics by Guy d'Hardelot and English lyrics by Edward Teschemacher, originally published in 1902.

Lyrics
The song's English lyrics by Edward Teschemacher are as follows:

Because, you come to me,
with naught save love,
and hold my hand and lift mine eyes above,
a wider world of hope and joy I see,
because you come to me!

Because you speak to me in accent sweet,
I find the roses waking 'round my feet,
and I am led through tears and joy to thee,
because you speak to me!

Because God made thee mine,
I'll cherish thee,
through light and darkness through all time to be,
and pray His love may make our love divine,
because God made thee mine!

Original French Lyrics:

Quand j’entends tes pas
Comme en un rêve
La folle espoir de te revoir s’élève
Et vainement vers toi je tends le bras
Quand j’entends tes pas

Et quand divinement ta voix m’enchaine
Je vois s’évanouir tout ma peine
Et tout ton être chante et vive en moi
Quand j’entends ta voix

Et puis tu viens à moi et je frissonne
Tu prends ma main et tout mon cœur se donne
A toi en un baiser brûlant d’émoi
Quand j’entends ta voix

Notable recordings
Tenor Enrico Caruso recorded the song in its original French on December 7, 1912. The record was issued by Victor in the USA, and in Europe by HMV, 1913.

A recording made on December 2, 1947 by RCA Victor was a hit for Perry Como in the spring of 1948. It was released on singles as follows:
In the United States, by RCA Victor, on 78rpm (catalog number 20-2653-A) with the flip side "If You Had All the World and Its Gold."  This single was released in 1949 as a 45rpm record (catalog number 47-2728)
Also in the US, by RCA Victor on 78rpm (catalog number 20-3299-A), with the flip side a re-release of "Till the End of Time". This single was released in 1949 as a 45rpm record (catalog number 47-2887).
In the United Kingdom, by HMV, as a 78rpm single (catalog BD-1215), in October 1948. The flip side was, "It Only Happens When I Dance with You".

The Como recording first entered the U.S. charts on March 13, 1948, and ultimately reached No. 4 on the chart.

The song was also sung by Mario Lanza in the 1951 biopic The Great Caruso. Lanza recorded it for RCA Victor, and it was issued as a single. Enrico Caruso himself recorded the song in 1912 with great success.

Recorded versions 
  
Jussi Björling
Andrea Bocelli
Joseph Calleja
José Carreras
Enrico Caruso
Perry Como
Franco Corelli
Jesse Crawford
Richard Crooks
Bing Crosby recorded the song in 1956 for use on his radio show, and it was subsequently issued on his album On the Sentimental Side (1962).
Plácido Domingo
Deanna Durbin
Nelson Eddy
Lesley Garrett
Kenneth W. Griffin
Roy Hamilton
Mahalia Jackson
Buddy Johnson - reached Billboard R&B charts in March 1950
Frankie Laine 
Mario Lanza - this reached the Billboard charts in 1951, peaking at the No. 16 position during a 14-week stay.
John McCormack
Vaughn Monroe
Jan Peerce
The Sandpebbles
Keely Smith - included in her album Because You're Mine (1962).
Richard Tauber
The Three Tenors
Eva Turner
Jerry Vale - included in his album Be My Love (1964).
Sarah Vaughan
Billy Vaughn
Evan Williams - very popular in 1910.
Constance Novis - soprano and actress  performs it in Season 1, Episode 2 of "Jeeves and Wooster" (1990). Novis: https://www.imdb.com/name/nm1179810/

References

1948 songs
Perry Como songs
Mario Lanza songs
Songs with music by Guy d'Hardelot
Songs with lyrics by Edward Teschemacher